Vladimir Nikolaevich Nikanorov 2 [15] July 1917, Moscow, Russian Empire - May 20, 1980, Moscow, USSR) - was a Soviet footballer (goalkeeper) and hockey player (defender). Honored Master of Sports of the USSR (since 1948). Five-time champion of the USSR in football, three-time winner of the USSR Cup in football. Three-time USSR ice hockey champion. The first captain of the USSR national ice hockey team. He was also part of the Soviet Union's squad for the 1952 Summer Olympics, but he did not play in any matches.

References

External links
  Profile

1917 births
1980 deaths
Soviet footballers
PFC CSKA Moscow players
SKA Lviv managers
Honoured Masters of Sport of the USSR
Footballers at the 1952 Summer Olympics
Olympic footballers of the Soviet Union
Association football goalkeepers